Tanymecus is a genus of broad-nosed weevils in the beetle family Curculionidae. There are at least 100 described species in Tanymecus.

See also
 List of Tanymecus species

References

Further reading

External links

 

Entiminae
Articles created by Qbugbot